Axente Sever (until 1931 Frâua;) is a commune located in Sibiu County, Transylvania, Romania, named after Ioan Axente Sever.

The commune is composed of three villages: Agârbiciu (Arbegen; Szászegerbegy), Axente Sever and Șoala (Schaal; Sálya). In each of these three villages there are Saxon fortified churches erected in the 14th century and fortified till the 16th century.

Gallery

References 

Augustin Ioan and Hanna Derer. The Fortified Churches of the Transylvanian Saxons. Noi Media Print, 2004

Communes in Sibiu County
Localities in Transylvania